Gadhi is the village development committee in the Narayani Zone of southeastern Nepal.

Gadhi may also refer to:
 Gadhi (structure), a type of small castle-like structure or fort in India
 Gadhi (tribe), a Baloch tribe in Pakistan
 Gadhi, Sunsari, a rural Municipality in Sunsari (Nepal)

See also 
 Gadi (disambiguation)
 Ghadi (disambiguation)